The Cat and the Cobra is the second album by Les Savy Fav. It was the first CD released by Frenchkiss Records, bassist Syd Butler's label.  The vinyl LP was released by Self-Starter Foundation.

The first track, "The Orchard," features guest backing vocals by Toko Yasuda, who went on to play in Enon.

Track listing
 "The Orchard" – 3:19
 "We've Got Boxes" – 3:59
 "Who Rocks the Party" – 2:31
 "Wake Up!" – 3:21
 "Roadside Memorial" – 6:20
 "Dishonest Don, Pt. I" – 1:34
 "Dishonest Don, Pt. II" – 3:57
 "The End" – 3:22
 "This Incentive" – 3:19
 "Reformat" – 3:12
 "Titan"/"Our Coastal Hymn (live, hidden track)" – 14:53

Credits
 Tim Harrington (vocals)
 Gibb Slife (guitar)
 Harrison Haynes (drums)
 Seth Jabour (guitar)
 Syd Butler (bass guitar)

References

1999 albums
Les Savy Fav albums
Frenchkiss Records albums